John Freeth (1731 – 29 September 1808), also known as Poet Freeth and who published his work under the pseudonym John Free, was an English innkeeper, poet and songwriter. As the owner of Freeth's Coffee House between 1768 and his death in 1808, he was  major figure in the political and cultural life of Birmingham during the Midlands Enlightenment.

References

Bibliography

See also
List of 18th-century British working-class writers

People from Birmingham, West Midlands
1731 births
1808 deaths
English male writers